Gonocephalus bellii, commonly known as Bell's anglehead lizard or Bell's forest dragon, is a species of lizard in the family Agamidae. The species is native to Southeast Asia and Oceania.

Etymology
The specific name, bellii, is in honor of English zoologist Thomas Bell.

Geographic range
G. bellii is indigenous to Thailand, Malacca, Perak, Pahang, Selangor, Indonesia (Borneo), and West Malaysia.

Habitat

Description
G. bellii ranges in color from greenish-grey to brown with deep brown stripes. Males have a colorful dewlap that ranges from teal to pinkish-purple.

Reproduction
G. bellii is oviparous. Clutch size is 3–5 eggs.

Taxonomy
Gonocephalus bellii may be closely related to or the same species as Gonocephalus bornensis.

References

Further reading
Boulenger GA (1885). Catalogue of the Lizards in the British Museum (Natural History). Second Edition. Volume I. ... Agamidæ. London: Trustees of the British Museum (Natural History). (Taylor and Francis, printers). xii + 436 pp. + Plates I-XXXII. (Gonyocephalus bellii, new combination, p. 288).
Duméril AMC, Bibron G (1837). Erpétologie générale ou Histoire naturelle complète des Reptiles, Tome quatrième [Volume 4]. Paris: Roret. ii + 571 pp. (Lophyrus bellii, new species, pp. 416–418). (in French).
Manthey U, Denzer W (1992). "Die Echten Winkelkopfagamen der Gattung Gonocephalus Kaup (Sauria: Agamidae), Tiel 5 Die bellii - Gruppe". Sauria 14 (3): 7–20. (in German).

bellii
Reptiles described in 1837
Taxa named by André Marie Constant Duméril
Taxa named by Gabriel Bibron
Reptiles of Borneo
Reptiles of the Malay Peninsula